Cambridge is a provincial electoral district in southwestern, Ontario, Canada. It elects one member to the Legislative Assembly of Ontario.

It was created in 1975.

From 1987 to 1999, it consisted of the city of Cambridge plus that part the township of North Dumfries located directly to the east of Cambridge.

From 1999 to 2007 it consisted of Cambridge, North Dumfries plus the city of Kitchener east of a line following Homer Watson Boulevard to Doon Village Road to Homer Watson Boulevard again, then to Huron Road to the Grand River.

In 2007, the riding included just Cambridge and North Dumfries.

Members of Provincial Parliament

Election results

2007 electoral reform referendum

Sources

Elections Ontario Past Election Results
Map of riding for 2018 election

Ontario provincial electoral districts
Politics of Cambridge, Ontario